The Rollins Tars  are the athletic teams that represent Rollins College, located in Winter Park, Florida, in NCAA Division II intercollegiate sports. The Tars—an archaic name for a sailor—compete as members of the Sunshine State Conference (SSC) for all 23 varsity sports. Rollins has been a member of the SSC since 1975.

Varsity teams

List of teams
 
 
Men's sports 
 Baseball 
 Basketball 
 Cross Country  
 Golf 
 Lacrosse 
 Rowing
 Sailing
 Soccer 
 Swimming
 Tennis 
 Water ski 
 
Women's sports 
 Basketball 
 Cross Country 
 Golf  
 Lacrosse 
 Rowing
 Sailing
 Soccer 
 Softball 
 Swimming
 Tennis 
 Volleyball 
 Water ski 

Rollins previously fielded a college football team, first in 1904 and last in 1949.

Women's golf
In 1950 and 1956, Betty Rowland and Marlene Stewart, respectively, won the women's individual intercollegiate golf championship (an event conducted by the Division of Girls' and Women's Sports (DGWS) — which later evolved into the current NCAA women's golf championship). In later years, Bettina Walker (1988, 1989), Debbie Pappas (1990, 1991, 1992), Mariana De Biase (2006) and Joanna Coe (2008) became individual national champions at the Small College and NCAA Division II levels. As a team, Rollins College has won 13 national championships.

National championships
The Tars have won twelve NCAA Division II team national championships.

Team

References

External links